Rinaldo Joseph "Rugger" Ardizoia (November 20, 1919 – July 19, 2015) was a Major League Baseball pitcher. The 5"11", 180 lb. right-hander was one of only seven Italian natives to ever play in the big leagues. He appeared in one game for the New York Yankees in 1947 and, at the time of his death, was the oldest living former member of the team.

Biography
Ardizoia was born in Oleggio, Italy. The 27-year-old rookie took the mound on April 30, 1947, at Sportsman's Park in the bottom of the seventh inning with the Yankees trailing the St. Louis Browns. He pitched two innings for New York and faced a total of 10 batters, giving up four hits, a walk, and two earned runs. The final score was Browns 15, Yankees 5. Ardizoia was credited with a game finished.

Ardizoia died on July 19, 2015, after a stroke suffered one week prior. At the time of his death, he was the oldest living former member of the New York Yankees, as well as the oldest in a group of nearly 1,500 players who have appeared in exactly one Major League game.

References

External links

SABR BioProject Biography

1919 births
2015 deaths
American people of Italian descent
Bellingham Chinooks players
Dallas Eagles players
Hollywood Stars players
Italian emigrants to the United States
Kansas City Blues (baseball) players
Major League Baseball players from Italy
Major League Baseball pitchers
Mission Reds players
New York Yankees players
Newark Bears players
Oakland Oaks (baseball) players
People from Oleggio
Seattle Rainiers players
Sportspeople from the Province of Novara